Amorin is a surname of Galician origin. Notable people with the surname include:

 Rubén Amorín (1927–2014), Uruguayan football player and coach
 Santiago Amorín (born 1994), Uruguayan footballer
 Tavio Amorin (1958–1992), Togolese politician

References

Galician-language surnames